Plaza de Armas is a plaza and local attraction in Centro, Puerto Vallarta, in the Mexican state of Jalisco.

Description
Located in Old Town, along the Malecón and adjacent to Presidencia Municipal, or city hall. The square is known for displaying art. Nearby attractions include Church of Our Lady of Guadalupe and Los Arcos amphitheatre.

The square features a bronze statue of Ignacio Vallarta, the Jalisco attorney and namesake of the city, by Miguel Carmona.

References

External links

 

Centro, Puerto Vallarta
Plazas in Jalisco
Tourist attractions in Jalisco